Tiberia minuscula is a species of minute sea snail, a marine gastropod mollusk in the family Pyramidellidae, the pyrams and their allies.

Description
The length of the shell varies between 4.5 mm and 6 mm.

Distribution
This marine species occurs in the following locations:
 European waters (ERMS scope)
 Mediterranean Sea : Greece, Morocco
 Portuguese Exclusive Economic Zone
 Spanish Exclusive Economic Zone: Canary Islands
 Cape Verde

References

 Rolán E., 2005. Malacological Fauna From The Cape Verde Archipelago. Part 1, Polyplacophora and Gastropoda.
 Templado, J. and R. Villanueva 2010 Checklist of Phylum Mollusca. pp. 148–198 In Coll, M., et al., 2010. The biodiversity of the Mediterranean Sea: estimates, patterns, and threats. PLoS ONE 5(8):36pp.
 van Aartsen, Gittenberger & Goud (1998), Pyramidellidae (Mollusca, Gastropoda, Heterobranchia) collected during the Dutch CANCAP and MAURITANIA expeditions in the south-eastern part of the North Atlantic Ocean (part 1)

External links
 To Biodiversity Heritage Library (1 publication)
 To CLEMAM
 To Encyclopedia of Life
 

Pyramidellidae
Gastropods described in 1880
Molluscs of the Atlantic Ocean
Molluscs of the Mediterranean Sea
Molluscs of the Canary Islands
Gastropods of Cape Verde
Molluscs of Europe
Invertebrates of North Africa